Robinsons Malabon (formerly Robinsons Town Mall Malabon) is a shopping mall located in Malabon, Metro Manila, Philippines. It is the first full service mall in Malabon owned and managed by Robinsons Land Corporation, the second largest mall operator in the Philippines. The mall was opened on December 4, 2013. It is the 37th mall opened by Robinsons in the Philippines and the first and only Robinsons mall in Malabon and the whole Camanava (North Metro Manila) area.

Description
Robinsons Town Mall sits on a  lot on the intersection of Governor Pascual Avenue and Crispin Street in Tinajeros village. The two-level shopping center is anchored. It also features a Lingkod Pinoy government services center. It is one of the two main shopping centers in Malabon along with Malabon Citisquare.

See also
 SM Center Sangandaan

References

Shopping malls in Metro Manila
Buildings and structures in Malabon
Robinsons Malls
Shopping malls established in 2013
2013 establishments in the Philippines